Model Town is a small neighbourhood on the southern part of the E.M. Bypass at Balia in Garia, close to Kolkata, India.  It is a posh locality with several housing complexes.  The locality is near to Garia railway station of Kolkata Suburban Railway. The premium residential complex 4 Sight Model Town is in this area.

See also
 New Garia

References

Neighbourhoods in Kolkata